Lyndell Simpson is a Montserratian who is the Deputy Governor of Montserrat in 2018. She succeeded Elizabeth Carriere, who held the position since 2015, and was succeeded by Andrew Pearce.

References

Living people
Montserratian women in politics
Governors of Montserrat
Year of birth missing (living people)
Place of birth missing (living people)